Athanasios "Thanos" Maroulis (born ) is a Greek male volleyball player. He is part of the Greece men's national volleyball team. On club level he plays for the Greek club Foinikas Syros.

References

External links
 profile at FIVB.org
 profile, club career, info at greekvolley.gr (in Greek)

1988 births
Living people
Greek men's volleyball players
Olympiacos S.C. players
Panathinaikos V.C. players
Place of birth missing (living people)
People from Ierapetra
Sportspeople from Crete